The Rottweiler (2003) is a psychological thriller novel by English crime writer Ruth Rendell.

External links 
Review from MysteryInkOnline.com
The Guardian review
Review from MostlyFiction.com

2003 British novels
Novels by Ruth Rendell
Hutchinson (publisher) books
Crown Publishing Group books
Doubleday Canada books